Cyril Charles Bowman Bardsley (13 February 1870 – 20 December 1940) was an Anglican bishop in the first half of the 20th century.

Bardsley was educated at Marlborough College and New College, Oxford and ordained in 1895. His first post was as a curate at Huddersfield Parish Church. He then held incumbencies at Nottingham and St Helen's, Merseyside.  He then became  the secretary of the Church Missionary Society until  his ordination to the episcopate as the Bishop of Peterborough in 1924. In 1927, he was translated to be the first diocesan Bishop of Leicester in the modern era. Described in his Times obituary as "a pastoral Bishop who lived for nothing but to serve his Master and minister to his people", he died shortly after resigning his see in Tunbridge Wells.

His nephew was Cuthbert Bardsley, who was Suffragan Bishop of Croydon from 1947 to 1956, and Bishop of Coventry from 1956 till 1976. He was also related to John Bardsley, Bishop of Sodor and Man from 1887 to 1891, and Bishop of Carlisle from 1891 to 1914.

References

1870 births
People educated at Marlborough College
Alumni of New College, Oxford
Bishops of Peterborough
Bishops of Leicester
1940 deaths
20th-century Church of England bishops